John P. Sullivan is a United States Army lieutenant general who serves as the deputy commander of United States Transportation Command since June 29, 2022. He most recently served as the 19th Director of Strategy, Capabilities, Policy, Programs, and Logistics of the United States Transportation Command from August 2021 to June 2022, and was previously the Commanding General of the 1st Sustainment Command (Theater).

References

External links
 

Living people
Place of birth missing (living people)
Recipients of the Defense Superior Service Medal
Recipients of the Distinguished Service Medal (US Army)
Recipients of the Legion of Merit
United States Army generals
United States Army personnel of the Gulf War
United States Army personnel of the Iraq War
United States Army personnel of the War in Afghanistan (2001–2021)
Year of birth missing (living people)